Myx Awards 2020 is the 15th installment of the Myx Music Awards, acknowledging the biggest hit makers of 2019 in the Philippine music industry. The awards were held virtually due to the ongoing coronavirus pandemic.

Nominees were announced on May 21, 2020 starting at 3:00 pm via Facebook, Twitter, and YouTube live streaming. IV of Spades and Shanti Dope led the nominees with six nominations each. For the ninth consecutive year, fans voted online through the Myx website. Voting ended on July 10.

A notable change made to the award system this year was the reduction in the total number of categories awarded, from 18 to 10.

Performances

Since the awards show happened virtually, all performances were recorded specifically for the MYX Music Awards 2020.

Winners and nominees
Winners are listed first and highlighted in boldface.

Multiple awards

Artists with multiple wins
The following artists received two or more awards:

Artists with multiple nominations
The following artists received more than two nominations:

References

External links
 MYX Official Site

Myx Music Awards
2020 music awards
Philippine music awards